The 1995 Kentucky gubernatorial election took place on November 7, 1995. Incumbent Governor Brereton Jones was not eligible to run for a second term due to term limits established by the Kentucky Constitution, creating an open seat. At the time, Kentucky and Virginia were the only states that prohibited their Governors from serving immediate successive terms. The Democratic nominee, Lieutenant Governor Paul E. Patton, defeated Republican nominee Larry Forgy to win his first term as governor. It was the last time that the election was held until the Kentucky General Assembly changed its term limits law in 1992, allowing Patton to run again in 1999 and leaving Virginia as the only state that prohibits its governor from serving immediate successive terms.

Democratic primary

Candidates
Paul E. Patton, Lieutenant Governor of Kentucky
Bob Babbage, Secretary of State of Kentucky
John A. Rose, Jr., Kentucky State Senator
Gatewood Galbraith, perennial candidate
Steven Maynard

Results

Republican primary

Candidates
Larry Forgy, counsel to Governor Louie B. Nunn
Robert E. Gable, perennial candidate
Tommy Klein, perennial candidate

Results

General election

Results

References

1995
Gubernatorial
Kentucky
November 1995 events in the United States